Ravenia spectabilis  is a species of Ravenia from Brazil.

References

External links
 
 

spectabilis